Andrew Easton (born 14 March 1877) was a Scottish professional footballer who played as a right back.

Career
Easton played for Leith Athletic, Airdrieonians, Hearts, Millwall Athletic, Rangers and Bradford City.

For Bradford City he made 14 appearances in the Football League.

Sources

References

1877 births
Year of death missing
Scottish footballers
Leith Athletic F.C. players
Airdrieonians F.C. (1878) players
Heart of Midlothian F.C. players
Millwall F.C. players
Rangers F.C. players
Bradford City A.F.C. players
Scottish Football League players
English Football League players
Association football fullbacks